Fort Atlantic is an American musical group based in Portland, Oregon.

History
Jon Black founded Fort Atlantic in 2010 after the dissolution of an Athens, Georgia-based record label he owned and operated. Black began recording songs on a home studio and worked with drummer Josh Cannon to realize them for live performances. Fort Atlantic released three EPs in 2010-11, after which Black worked with producer Tom Schick on a full-length album.
In 2012, Fort Atlantic signed with Dualtone Records and released a self-titled LP. The album reached #32 on the Billboard Heatseekers charts. In addition to CD and digital formats, the album was also released as a Nintendo cartridge. Songs from the self-titled album, "Fort Atlantic", featured in a season six episode of Californication. a season eight episode of How I Met Your Mother. Following the release of the album, the band played the Bonnaroo Music Festival.

Band members
 Current
Jon Black - vocals, guitars, keyboards, synthesizers, programming
Gus Berry - guitars, keyboards, vocals
Tim Coulter - bass, guitars, vocals, synthesizers
Evan Railton - drums, percussion, programming, synthesizers

 Former
Josh Cannon - drums, percussion, programming, synthesizers

Discography
Fort Atlantic (Dualtone Records, 2012)
Shadow Shaker Vol. 1  (Hot Garbage, 2017)

References

Indie rock musical groups from Oregon
Musical groups from Birmingham, Alabama
Musical groups from Portland, Oregon
Indie rock musical groups from Alabama